Bauxite is a sedimentary rock with a relatively high aluminium content. It is the world's main source of aluminium and gallium. Bauxite consists mostly of the aluminium minerals gibbsite (Al(OH)3), boehmite (Y-AlO(OH)) and diaspore (α-AlO(OH)), mixed with the two iron oxides goethite (FeO(OH)) and haematite (Fe2O3), the aluminium clay mineral kaolinite (Al2Si2O5(OH)4) and small amounts of anatase (TiO2) and ilmenite (FeTiO3 or FeO.TiO2).
Bauxite appears dull in luster and is reddish-brown, white, or tan.

In 1821, the French geologist Pierre Berthier discovered bauxite near the village of Les Baux in Provence, southern France.

Formation 

Numerous classification schemes have been proposed for bauxite but, there was no consensus.

Vadász (1951) distinguished lateritic bauxites (silicate bauxites) from karst bauxite ores (carbonate bauxites):

 The carbonate bauxites occur predominantly in Europe, Guyana, Suriname, and Jamaica above carbonate rocks (limestone and dolomite), where they were formed by lateritic weathering and residual accumulation of intercalated clay layers – dispersed clays which were concentrated as the enclosing limestones gradually dissolved during chemical weathering.
 The lateritic bauxites are found mostly in the countries of the tropics.  They were formed by lateritization of various silicate rocks such as granite, gneiss, basalt, syenite, and shale.  In comparison with the iron-rich laterites, the formation of bauxites depends even more on intense weathering conditions in a location with very good drainage. This enables the dissolution of the kaolinite and the precipitation of the gibbsite.  Zones with highest aluminium content are frequently located below a ferruginous surface layer.  The aluminium hydroxide in the lateritic bauxite deposits is almost exclusively gibbsite.

In the case of Jamaica, recent analysis of the soils showed elevated levels of cadmium, suggesting that the bauxite originates from Miocene volcanic ash deposits from episodes of significant volcanism in Central America.

Production and reserves

Australia is the largest producer of bauxite, followed by Guinea and China. Increased aluminium recycling, which requires less electric power than producing aluminium from ores, will considerably extend the world's bauxite reserves.

Processing

Bauxite is usually strip mined because it is almost always found near the surface of the terrain, with little or no overburden. , approximately 70% to 80% of the world's dry bauxite production is processed first into alumina and then into aluminium by electrolysis. Bauxite rocks are typically classified according to their intended commercial application: metallurgical, abrasive, cement, chemical, and refractory.

At these temperatures, the aluminium is dissolved as sodium aluminate (the Bayer process). The aluminium compounds in the bauxite may be present as gibbsite(Al(OH)3), boehmite(AlOOH) or diaspore(AlOOH); the different forms of the aluminium component will dictate the extraction conditions. The undissolved waste, bauxite tailings, after the aluminium compounds are extracted contains iron oxides, silica, calcia, titania and some un-reacted alumina. After separation of the residue by filtering, pure gibbsite is precipitated when the liquid is cooled, and then seeded with fine-grained aluminium hydroxide. Next, this molten substance can yield metallic aluminium by passing an electric current through it in the process of electrolysis, which is called the Hall–Héroult process, named after its American and French discoverers.

Prior to the invention of this process, and prior to the Deville process, aluminium ore was refined by heating ore along with elemental sodium or potassium in a vacuum. The method was complicated and consumed materials that were themselves expensive at that time. This made early elemental aluminium more expensive than gold.

Maritime safety
As a bulk cargo, Bauxite is a Group A cargo that may liquefy if excessively moist. Liquefaction and the Free surface effect can cause the cargo to shift rapidly inside the hold and make the ship unstable, potentially sinking the ship. One vessel suspected to have been sunk in this way was the MS Bulk Jupiter in 2015. One method which can demonstrate this effect is the Can test, in which a sample of the material is placed in a cylindrical can and struck against a surface many times. If a moist slurry forms in the can, then there is a likelihood for the cargo to liquefy; although conversely, even if the sample remains dry it does not conclusively prove that it will remain that way, or that it is safe for loading.

Source of gallium
Bauxite is the main source of the rare metal gallium.

During the processing of bauxite to alumina in the Bayer process, gallium accumulates in the sodium hydroxide liquor. From this it can be extracted by a variety of methods. The most recent is the use of ion-exchange resin. Achievable extraction efficiencies critically depend on the original concentration in the feed bauxite. At a typical feed concentration of 50 ppm, about 15 percent of the contained gallium is extractable. The remainder reports to the red mud and aluminium hydroxide streams.

See also
Bauxite, Arkansas
Rio Tinto Alcan
United Company RUSAL
MS Bulk Jupiter

References

Further reading
Bárdossy, G. (1982): Karst Bauxites: Bauxite deposits on carbonate rocks. Elsevier Sci. Publ. 441 p.
Bárdossy, G. and Aleva, G.J.J. (1990): Lateritic Bauxites. Developments in Economic Geology 27, Elsevier Sci. Publ. 624 p. 
Grant, C.; Lalor, G. and Vutchkov, M. (2005) Comparison of bauxites from Jamaica, the Dominican Republic and Suriname. Journal of Radioanalytical and Nuclear Chemistry p. 385–388 Vol.266, No.3
Hanilçi, N. (2013). Geological and geochemical evolution of the Bolkardaği bauxite deposits, Karaman, Turkey: Transformation from shale to bauxite. Journal of Geochemical Exploration

External links

USGS Minerals Information: Bauxite
Mineral Information Institute

Sedimentary rocks
Aluminium minerals
 
Articles containing video clips
Regolith
Weathering